Enderby is a village and civil parish in Leicestershire, England, on the southwest outskirts of the city of Leicester. The parish includes the neighbourhood of St John's, which is east of the village separated from it by the M1 motorway. The 2011 Census recorded the parish's population as 6,314.

The village's name means 'farm/settlement of Eindrithi'.

The village is situated on the B4114 between Fosse Shopping Park and Narborough. The parish includes Fosse Shopping Park, Grove Park Commercial Centre and Everards Brewery.

The parish is bounded by the City of Leicester and the civil parishes of Braunstone Town, Glen Parva, Lubbesthorpe, Narborough and Whetstone.

The course of the Fosse Way Roman road passes through the parish. Near St John's is the deserted village of Aldeby by the River Soar.

Enderby Hall was the ancestral home of the Smith family when the paternal line ended. The hall was left to Charles Loraine who took the name Charles Loraine Smith.

Governance
Enderby was in the Parliamentary constituency of Blaby between 1974 and 2010, when it was replaced with the South Leicestershire constituency. It is currently represented in the House of Commons by Alberto Costa MP of the Conservative Party.

Former railway
A disused freight only railway line known locally as ‘Whistle Way’ is to the north of the village. This branch line used to link the now disused Enderby Warren Quarry with the Birmingham to Leicester Line.

Economy

Enderby is home to Fosse Shopping Park, one of Britain's biggest out-of-town shopping parks. The village centre has a newsagents, petrol station, florists, beauty salon, delicatessen, library, cafe, bookmakers, and hand car wash. It has two "Co-operative Food" stores within metres of each other, one owned by Central England Co-operative and another by The Co-operative Group.

Enderby has a leisure centre with swimming pool, gym, squash courts and sports hall for badminton and 5-a-side football. There is also a nine-hole pay-and-play golf course. The Nags Head pub in Enderby is a popular attraction and a known watering hole of ex-forces.

The head office of clothing retailer Next plc is located in Enderby.

Transport

Road
Enderby is near the M1 and M69 motorways. The B4114 and B582 both run through the village.

Rail
Rail transport is provided by nearby Narborough railway station on the Birmingham to Peterborough Line. Trains are operated by CrossCountry and provide regular services to Leicester, Hinckley, Nuneaton and Birmingham.

Bus
Arriva Midlands operate services 50, X55 and X84 from Leicester into the village.

Enderby Park and Ride is situated on the corner of B4114 St John's and Leicester Lane, opposite Leicestershire Constabulary Headquarters and Palmers Garden Centre, and was opened on 16 November 2009. It has parking for 1,000 cars. Buses run every 15 minutes into Leicester city centre from 7am to 7pm, Mondays to Saturdays. Stops include Smith Way (Grove Park), Aylestone Road (Leicester Royal Infirmary), Oxford Street (De Montfort University) and St. Nicholas Circle (stand FD).

Education

The schools that Enderby children usually attend are:
Danemill Primary School
Brockington College

Sport
Enderby Town Football Club was founded in 1900. It played in the local Leicestershire Senior League until 1969, and joined the Southern League in 1972. It changed its name to Leicester United F.C. in 1983 and was dissolved in 1996.

Crime
Enderby was where Colin Pitchfork raped and murdered a 15-year-old schoolgirl in 1986. He also killed a girl of the same age in nearby Narborough in 1983. Initially a 17-year-old youth was suspected, and even confessed to one of the murders, but DNA testing cleared him. Following what was the first mass DNA screening of an entire community, Pitchfork was the first person to be convicted of murder using DNA profiling.

Sister village
 Le Haillan (France)

References

External links

Enderby Parish Council
Enderby Heritage Group
Enderby from genuki.org.uk

Civil parishes in Leicestershire
Villages in Leicestershire
Blaby